Mak Soi-kun (born 15 April 1956 in Macau) is a member of the Legislative Assembly of Macau. With a construction business in the city, Mak and fellow legislator Zheng Anting, a casino VIP room manager, founded the Macau Jiangmen Communal Society and provide social benefits to new immigrants. He later entered politics with a remarkable support from the working class after his mediation in the collapse of Sin Fong Garden.

Election results

See also
 List of members of the Legislative Assembly of Macau

References

1956 births
Living people
Cantonese people
Members of the Legislative Assembly of Macau